Gmsh is a finite-element mesh generator developed by Christophe Geuzaine and Jean-François Remacle. Released under the GNU General Public License, Gmsh is free software.

Gmsh contains 4 modules: for geometry description, meshing, solving and post-processing. Gmsh supports parametric input and has advanced visualization mechanisms. Since version 3.0, Gmsh supports full constructive solid geometry features, based on Open Cascade Technology.

A modified version of Gmsh is integrated with SwiftComp, a general-purpose multiscale modeling software. The modified version, called Gmsh4SC, is compiled and deployed on the Composites Design and Manufacturing HUB (cdmHUB).

Interfaces 

Various graphical user interfaces exist that integrate Gmsh into their workflow:
 A Matlab interface available with FEATool Multiphysics.
 The Mesh Design and FEM Workbenches of FreeCAD support Gmsh for meshing inside the program, along with other meshers like Netgen.

See also

 TetGen
 Salome (software)

References

External links
Gmsh website
Official Gmsh Documentation
Gmsh Tutorials by Dolfyn
Gmsh Matlab and FEATool GUI and CLI integration

Free mathematics software
Free software programmed in C++
Cross-platform free software
Mesh generators
Numerical analysis software for Linux
Numerical analysis software for macOS
Numerical analysis software for Windows
Software that uses FLTK
Computer-aided engineering software for Linux